Wollastonaria oxytropis is a species of air-breathing land snail, a terrestrial pulmonate gastropod mollusk in the family Geomitridae, the hairy snails and their allies. 

This species is endemic to Madeira, Portugal.

References

External links
 Lowe, R. T. (1831). Primitiae faunae et florae Maderae et Portus Sancti; sive species quaedam novae vel hactenus minus rite cognitae animalium et plantarum in his insulis degentium breviter descriptae. Transactions of the Cambridge Philosophical Society. 4 (1): 1-70, pl. 1-6. Cambridge
 Wollaston, T.V. (1878). Testacea Atlantica or the land and freshwater shells of the Azores, Madeiras, Salvages, Canaries, Cape Verdes, and Saint Helena. i-xi, [1, 1-588, 1-16. London. (Reeve)]

Molluscs of Europe
Geomitridae
Taxa named by Richard Thomas Lowe
Gastropods described in 1831
Taxonomy articles created by Polbot